Tripylella fatimaensis is a species of nematodes, first found in Quito, Ecuador. It can be distinguished by its rather short body (averaging  in length); the length of its pharynx, tail and diameter portion; its lack of an excretory pore; possessing body pores as well as three pairs of caudal setae, among other characteristics.

References 

Enoplia